Joseph Bartlett-Vanderpuye, better known by his stage name Smiler, is a British rapper, who was born in London. Vanderpuye first entered the limelight after releasing an underground mixtape in 2009, as well as the single "Enza".

After being spotted by a talent scout, Vanderpuye was signed to Warner Music UK, and released his debut single, "Delorean", featuring fellow rapper Wretch 32 in March 2012.

Vanderpuye ended his relationship with Warner Music in 2013 following the release of his fourth single, "Brand New Style". He then launched his own imprint Portfolio Music in 2014 where as Director he's signed and developed multiple acts.

Background
Joseph Bartlett-Vanderpuye was born in London. His musical career began in 2009 when he released the underground mixtape "Da Musical Omnibus" via Elementary Entertainment. Following the release, Vanderpuye began working on his debut single with the label, and on 8 August 2010, released "Enza".

Producer Jakwob subsequently contacted Vanderpuye and asked him to contribute vocals to his upcoming single, "Right Beside You". The single was released on New Year's Day 2011 and was heavily supported by BBC Radio 1. Vanderpuye was subsequently signed as a support act for British rappers Wretch 32 and Professor Green, and toured with the pair extensively throughout 2011. Vanderpuye was subsequently spotted by a talent scout at one of Green's concerts, and subsequently, was offered a record deal with Warner Music UK. Vanderpuye began work on his debut project with the label, and released mixtape "All I Know" as a taster of his upcoming record.

Vanderpuye released his first single with the label, "Delorean", in March 2012. The track featured fellow rapper and friend Wretch 32, although was initially demoed with rapper Lady Leshurr (with several promotional copies of the single being issued with Leshurr's version on). On 8 June 2012 Vanderpuye released his second single, "Rock Steady", which featured the collaboration of singer and rapper Sneakbo. Vanderpuye contacted former touring partner Professor Green and asked him to record a verse for his new single, "Top of the World", which features rising star Taiwah. Green agreed and the single was subsequently released on 28 August 2015, peaking at #63 on the UK Singles Chart the following week.

In early 2013, a sampler featuring previously unreleased material from the album, surfaced online. Tracks on the sampler included hit single "Top of the World", as well as "Real Thing", "X", "Tonight (Part 1)", "Quicksand" and "Streets of London". Snippets of "Quicksand", "Streets of London" and "Real Thing" had previously appeared on an internal record company sampler which surfaced in March 2012, which also contained an alternate version of "Top of the World", only featuring Green. Vanderpuye returned in August 2013 and announced the release of his latest single, "Brand New Style", as well as his debut album of the same name, due for release in November 2013. "Brand New Style" was again supported by BBC Radio 1, but upon its release on 20 September 2013 again failed to chart. At this point, Warner Music UK announced they were terminating Vanderpuye's record deal and his debut album subsequently remains unreleased. A track listing for the album was announced prior to its release being cancelled, and subsequently, certain tracks from the album have subsequently surfaced online.

Vanderpuye continues to tour and record, and is currently working on a new record deal with an independent label.

Discography

Albums

Mixtapes
 The Musical Omnibus (2009)
 Clarity (2010)
 All I Know (2012)
 The Coming (2013)
 Mark 4 Music (2022)

Singles

References

Living people
Grime music artists
Rappers from London
Black British male rappers
English people of Ghanaian descent
Ga-Adangbe people
Year of birth missing (living people)
Vanderpuije family of Ghana
People from Accra
Ghanaian people of Dutch descent